The Baja pygmy owl (Glaucidium hoskinsii) or cape pygmy owl, is a subspecies of northern pygmy owl restricted to the Mexican state of Baja California Sur.  Although some taxonomists, including the International Ornithologists' Union, consider it to be a distinct species, other authorities, including the American Ornithological Society,  do not consider it separate, and consider it to be a subspecies of the northern pygmy owl.

Classification
The American Ornithological Society considers the Baja pygmy owl a subspecies of the northern pygmy owl, Glaucidium gnoma (as it does several other populations). It has also been classified as a subspecies of the least pygmy owl.  However, it is given the status of a separate species here following the Handbook of the Birds of the World. According to one authority, DNA evidence suggests that the two species are not closely related.

Etymology
The epithet hoskinsii commemorates Francis Hoskins, an assistant to Marston Abbott Frazar, an ornithologist who the American businessman George Burritt Sennett paid to collect birds in the 1880s.  The first specimen of the Baja pygmy owl was collected on one of Frazar's expeditions.

Description
It is 15 to 16.5 cm 
or 17 cm (6 to 7 inches) long and weighs 50 to 65 g (1.8–2.3 oz).  Its plumage is sandy gray-brown, with females typically more reddish than males. Unlike many related owls, it does not seem to have gray and red morphs. The adult's crown and back have many pale spots, which are biggest on the scapular feathers (i.e., where the wings join the back). The tail is long for an owl and is crossed by five or six pale bars. The underparts are off-white with brown streaks. The face shows little contrast except for white "false eyebrows". Like other pygmy owls (Glaucidium), it has yellow irises and a yellow bill, as well as two white-outlined black triangles on the back of the neck that suggest eyespots.

The commonly heard call is distinctly different from that of other pygmy owls in the region: a hoo hoo lasting about two seconds, with five to fifteen seconds between double hoots. This species occasionally begins a bout of hooting with up to five hoots in series. It may also utter "a rapid, slightly quavering huhuhu…" that may lead to hooting.

Range and habitat
The cape pygmy owl is endemic to Baja California Sur from the Sierra de la Laguna in the Cape District, where it is fairly common, to the Sierra de la Giganta at least as far north as 26.5°N.  It inhabits pine and pine-oak woods from 1500 to 2100 m (5000–7000 ft.) in altitude.  In winter it can descend to 500 m (1,640 ft.).

References

External links
 Page with images and sound recording from Owling.com.  Accessed Sept. 25, 2007.

Baja pygmy owl
Birds of Mexico
Endemic birds of Western Mexico
Baja pygmy owl
Taxa named by William Brewster (ornithologist)